Ilse Frieda Gertrud Stöbe (17 May 1911 – 22 December 1942) was a German journalist and anti-Nazi resistance fighter. She was born and died in Berlin.

Life
Ilse Stöbe grew up in a working-class home in Berlin. Stöbe was the only daughter of carpenter Max Stöbe and his wife Frieda ( Schumann). She had an eight-year-older half-brother from her mother's first marriage, Kurt Müller. She grew up in Mainzer Straße 1 in Lichtenberg, Berlin There is little information about their youth.

Stöbe attended a trade school to learn a profession as a shorthand typist. After school, she was first employed in the publishing house of Rudolf Mosse and then worked as secretary to the journalist and writer Theodor Wolff in the Berliner Tageblatt. There she met Rudolf Herrnstadt, to whom she would later become engaged.

In 1929, Stöbe joined the Communist Party of Germany. From 1931, she worked with Herrnstadt, who built up an intelligence group of the Am Apparat (Military section) of the Communist International, which in addition to him and Stöbe, Gerhard Kegel and his wife Charlotte Vogt, at times also the publisher Helmut Kindler and the lawyer Lothar Bolz all belonged. Together with Herrnstadt in 1934, they moved to Warsaw, where she worked as a foreign correspondent for the Neue Zürcher Zeitung until September 1939 and also wrote for other Swiss newspapers. Stöbe was then a member of the National Socialist German Workers Party (Nazi Party) and in mid-1934 was appointed Cultural Attaché of the Nazi party's foreign office in Poland.

According to Helmut Kindler, she remained in contact with him as her childhood friend. During the 1936 Summer Olympics in Berlin, Stöbe met the Swiss publisher Rudolf Huber, who left her a major part of his fortune in his will when he died in 1940.

Shortly before the German invasion of Poland, she returned to Berlin from Warsaw and worked in the information department of the Foreign Office.  There she met the journalist Carl Helfrich, with whom she lived until her arrest in 1942. According to her will, he was the tenant of her flat in Ahornallee 48 in Charlottenburg, Berlin.

Career
Initially, from 1930, Stöbe
was a member of the reconnaissance group of Rudolf Herrnstadt, where he was listed under the name of Friedrich Brockmann, and from that time began to volunteer for Soviet intelligence under the pseudonym Arbin. In Soviet intelligence, Stöbe received the pseudonym "Arnim". During Herrnstadt's trip to Prague in 1930, she began to work directly with the Soviet resident in Berlin, Yakov Bronin, who was introduced to her as "Dr. Bosch." 

Gerhard Kegel, who was an employee of the Foreign Office in Berlin from 1935 to 1943, supported Stöbe in her clandestine intelligence activities after returning from Poland. She allegedly continued this activity until her arrest in 1942.

Stöbe was arrested on 12 September 1942 by the Gestapo, allegedly for spying for the Soviet Union and for membership of the Red Orchestra (Die Rote Kapelle). A Gestapo report of November 1942, stated a radio message from the Soviet Union informed that a parachuted resistance fighter would come to her address. After seven weeks of torture she was compelled to confess to conspiratorial connections to the Soviet secret service and to people such as Rudolf von Scheliha. He was arrested on 12 October 1942. Both were sentenced to death for treason on 14 December 1942 by the Reichskriegsgericht, and executed on 22 December 1942 in the Plötzensee Prison in Berlin, she by guillotine and he by hanging from a meathook. The Soviet agent, Heinrich Koenen, who had landed in Germany by parachute, was arrested at her house by a waiting Gestapo official.
Her mother was also arrested and sent to Ravensbrück concentration camp, where she died in 1943. Stöbe's brother Kurt Müller was able to escape arrest and continue his resistance activities with the resistance group, the European Union Resistance. He was murdered in June 1944.
 
Stöbe (code name "Alta") repeatedly sent warning messages to the Soviet Union about the impending German invasion of the Soviet Union well in advance of the attack.

Awards and honours
She was the only woman to be featured on a special coin issued by the East German Ministry of State (Stasi) to commemorate important spies in Communist service during the war. The Ilse Stöbe Vocational School in Market Street, Berlin is named in her honour.

In July, 2014, Germany's Foreign Ministry honoured Ilse Stöbe for her actions against the Nazis.

Literature

Witnesses

Biographical-historical
 

 
 
 
 
 
 
 
 Luise Kraushaar and others: Deutsche Widerstandskämpfer 1933–1945. Biografien und Briefe. [German Resistance fighters 1933-1945. Biographies and letters.] edition. vom Institut für Marxismus-Leninismus beim Zentralkomitee der SED; Dietz-Verlag, Berlin 1970, Volume 1, pp. 657ff; Volume 2, pp. 561f

Historical environment
 
 
  (online, russisch)

References

1911 births
1942 deaths
People from Berlin executed at Plötzensee Prison
Red Orchestra (espionage)
People condemned by Nazi courts
Executed communists in the German Resistance
People executed by guillotine at Plötzensee Prison
German spies for the Soviet Union
Executed spies
People executed for treason against Germany
Executed German women
World War II spies for the Soviet Union